In mathematics, the Carleson–Jacobs theorem, introduced by , describes the best approximation to a continuous function on the unit circle by a function in a Hardy space.

Notes

References

Theorems in complex analysis
Hardy spaces